Vinicius de Rapozo Carvalho (born 7 January 1966) is a Brazilian politician as well as a lawyer, radio personality, and pastor. Although born in Rio de Janeiro, he has spent his political career representing São Paulo, having served as state representative from 2007 to 2011 and since 2014.

Personal life
Carvalho is originally a lawyer, and is also a pastor of the neo-Pentecostal movement the Universal Church of the Kingdom of God. Carvalho has his own radio show titled "Show da Cidadania" or "Show of Citizenship".

Political career
Carvalho voted in favor of the impeachment against then-president Dilma Rousseff. Carvalho voted in favor of the 2017 Brazilian labor reform, and would later back Rousseff's successor Michel Temer against a similar impeachment motion.

In late 2016 Carvalho proposed a bill that would make polygamy illegal in Brazil. The same bill regarded marriage as solely between a man and a woman, and would in theory make infidelity and same-sex partnerships illegal.

References

1966 births
Living people
Politicians from Rio de Janeiro (city)
20th-century Brazilian lawyers
Republicans (Brazil) politicians
Brazilian radio personalities
Brazilian Pentecostal pastors
Members of the Universal Church of the Kingdom of God
Members of the Chamber of Deputies (Brazil) from São Paulo